Sacro Cuore ("Sacred Heart") is a church in the Italian city of Monza, in the neighborhood of Triante, dedicated to the Sacred Heart of Jesus.

History
The church was built in neoclassical style.  The building lies on Via Vittorio Veneto, one of the main roads in the district. In the 1930s as the suburb of Monza grew, so did the need for a church for the local population, until then served by the small church in the nearby district of San Biago. With help from the parish of San Biagio, the site was purchased, and the church was consecrated in 1935.

The parish of the church also manages the Don Bosco oratory, a chapel located on the Via Duca D'Aosta, behind the church.

Roman Catholic churches in Monza
19th-century Roman Catholic church buildings in Italy
Neoclassical architecture in Lombardy
Neoclassical church buildings in Italy